New Mill, West Yorkshire, England, is a small, semi-rural village near the town of Holmfirth. It is in the metropolitan borough of Kirklees and the civil parish of Holme Valley. The village had a population of 1,259 (with Fulstone) in the 2001 census.

The centre of the village is now on the crossroads of the Huddersfield - Sheffield A616  and Barnsley - Manchester A635 roads. There is a Post Office, one pub, one Indian restaurant, a branch of the local Co-op and 2 pharmacies plus other amenities all centred on the crossroads. The village centre used to be sited slightly further east near the church on Sude Hill.

Unsurprisingly, there were textile mills in the village such as Moorhouse & Brook, on Greenhill Bank Road, and Bower and Roebuck, nestling in the valley just off the A616 Sheffield Road.  With the decline in traditional heavy woollen industries both these mills have now closed. Bower & Roebuck's Wildspur Mills provided an opportunity for property developers to convert it into flats, Moorhouse & Brook's mill has been demolished and a new housing development built on the site.

The village is also home to the New Mill Male Voice Choir, which was established in 1991.

New Mill was created an urban district of the West Riding of Yorkshire in 1895, and covered the parishes of Fulstone, Hepworth and Scholes.  The urban district was abolished in 1938 by a County Review Order which saw the district and parishes merged into the urban district and parish of Holmfirth, which has been since included in Kirklees, West Yorkshire and renamed Holme Valley.

References

External links 

New Mill Male Voice Choir
Christ Church, New Mill

Villages in West Yorkshire
Holme Valley
Geography of Holmfirth
Towns and villages of the Peak District